Parliamentary elections were held in Nauru on 18 December 1976. Following the election, Bernard Dowiyogo was elected President by Members of the Parliament.

Background
In July 1976 Parliament had forced President Hammer DeRoburt – head of state since independence in 1968 – to resign after refusing to pass financial bills. However, within a few hours DeRoburt was re-elected president unopposed.

Campaign
A total of 43 candidates contested the elections, two of whom were elected unopposed.

An informal Nauru Party was formed prior to the election, the first party on the island. Its members were younger MPs who had been concerned about the country's economic policy and saw DeRoburt's government of making decisions without proper discussion.

Results
15 of the 18 incumbents were re-elected. Lagumot Harris, MP for Ubenide, was surprisingly defeated.

Aftermath
The newly elected Parliament met on 21 December and re-elected  Kenas Aroi was re-elected as Speaker. After DeRoburt refused to listen to suggestions that he appoint some new ministers to his cabinet, he lost the vote for president to Bernard Dowiyogo by nine votes to seven. Following the election, Nauru Party MPs met with DeRoburt and promised that Dowiyogo would resign and allow him to run unopposed if he reconsidered making changes to his cabinet. However, he refused, taking the view that the president should be free to choose their own cabinet.

Dowiyogo appointed a new cabinet, including Aroi, who subsequently resigned as Speaker. Samuel Tsitsi was elected in his place.

On 24 December, DeRoburt called a special session of parliament to propose a motion that the new government had been formed outside the constitution, which did not provide for party politics. The debate was halted when Tsisti resigned as Speaker, also giving up his seat in Parliament. The following week David Gadaroa was elected as the third Speaker of the parliamentary term.

The Supreme Court later overturned the election of Derog Gioura. Kennan Adeang was declared elected in his place. In 1977 MP René Harris – who had replaced Tsitsi after his resignation – was removed from Parliament after being convicted of assault. In the subsequent by-election, he was re-elected with 95 votes, defeating Reginald Akiri (41 votes), John Bill (12) and August Deiye (10).

References

Nauru
1976 in Nauru
Elections in Nauru
Non-partisan elections
Election and referendum articles with incomplete results